Balauda Takun railway station is a small railway station in Indore district, Madhya Pradesh. Its code is BLDK. It serves Balauda Takun village. The station consists of two platforms. The platforms are not well sheltered. It lacks many facilities including water and sanitation.

References

Railway stations in Indore district
Ratlam railway division